Timur Zayndiyevich Alaskhanov (born 22 February 1979) is a Russian former competitive ice dancer.  With Ekaterina Gvozdkova, he competed at three Grand Prix events and at the 2001 Winter Universiade. In the 2001–02 season, Gvozdkova/Alaskhanov were coached by Larisa Fedorinova in Moscow. The following season, they trained under Natalia Dubova in Stamford, Connecticut.

Programs 
(with Gvozdkova)

Competitive highlights 
GP: Grand Prix

With Gvozdkova

With Chalova

References

External links 
 

1979 births
Russian male ice dancers
Living people
Figure skaters from Moscow
Russian State University of Physical Education, Sport, Youth and Tourism alumni
Competitors at the 2001 Winter Universiade
20th-century Russian people